Cambridge Animation Systems was a British software company that developed a traditional animation software package called Animo, and is now part of Canadian company Toon Boom Technologies. It was based in Cambridge, England, hence the name. Established in 1990, it created the Animo software in 1992 after acquiring Compose in Color, which was developed by Oliver Unter-ecker. Animo was used for several animated feature films, shorts, and television series, and it powered the UK animation industry until the 2000s as it was used by studios like King Rollo Films, Telemagination, and Cosgrove Hall Films, but it was also used by studios in other countries, most notably Warner Bros. Feature Animation, DreamWorks, and Nelvana. In total, Animo was used by over 300 studios worldwide.

In 2000, CAS developed Animo Inkworks, a plug-in which allowed Maya and 3ds Max users to export 3D data into Animo and integrate it into 2D animation via the Scene III plug-in. In 2001, they developed another plug-in called Animo Sniffworks, which exports Flash output to Maya.

In 2009, CAS was acquired by Toon Boom Technologies and has since folded.

See also
 Toon Boom Technologies, which acquired CAS and its Animo package
 Toonz, another prolific animation software used by the 2D industry in the 1990s and 2000s
 USAnimation
 Computer Animation Production System (CAPS), used by Disney from the 1990s to the mid-2000s
 Adobe Flash
 List of 2D animation software

References

External links
 

2D animation software
Defunct companies of England
Defunct software companies of the United Kingdom
Companies based in Cambridge
Software companies established in 1990
Software companies disestablished in 2009
British companies established in 1990
1990 establishments in England
2009 disestablishments in England